Westminster Theological Journal is an evangelical theological journal published by Westminster Theological Seminary and edited by Vern Poythress.

References

External links

Protestant studies journals
Publications established in 1938
English-language journals
Biannual journals